United Nations Security Council Resolution 37, adopted on December 9, 1947, adapted the section of the rules of procedure for the Council governing the application for membership of new nations.

The resolution was adopted without a vote.

See also
List of United Nations Security Council Resolutions 1 to 100 (1946–1953)

References
Text of the Resolution at undocs.org

External links
 

 0037
 0037
 0037
December 1947 events